for Gurlitt's  uncle, the composer of the same name, see Cornelius Gurlitt (composer)
for Gurlitt's  grandson, the art collector of the same name, see Cornelius Gurlitt (art collector)

Cornelius Gustav Gurlitt (1 January 1850 – 25 March 1938) was a German architect and art historian.

Life
Gurlitt was born in Nischwitz in Thallwitz, Saxony, the son of the landscape painter Louis Gurlitt and nephew of his namesake, the composer Cornelius Gurlitt. He left the gymnasium of Gotha before graduation and became a carpenter's apprentice. After studying in Stuttgart and Vienna he worked as an architect, then obtained a position at the Arts and Crafts Museum in Dresden.

He married Marie Gerlach in 1888. They had three children, the musicologist Wilibald Gurlitt, expressionist painter Cornelia Gurlitt (1890–1919) and the art dealer and historian Hildebrand Gurlitt.

Gurlitt died in Dresden in 1938 and is buried in the Johannisfriedhof.

Career
While an assistant at the Arts and Crafts Museum in Dresden, Gurlitt wrote a pioneering work on baroque art. This led to a doctorate and a professorship at the Technische Universität Dresden, where he worked until his emeritat in 1920.

He was co-founder and president of the Bund Deutscher Architekten ("Association of German Architects") and principal of the Technische Universität Dresden, where he was also professor of art history and the history of construction.

He is regarded as the founder of art historical research into the Baroque, and thus as the founder of the conservation of historical monuments in Saxony. He often worked as a consultant with the architects Schilling & Graebner. From 1894 he continued the Saxon inventory work of the art historian Franz Richard Steche.

Works 
Gurlitt wrote 97 books and more than 400 scholarly articles, not only on architecture and art, but also on political problems. Some of his works are:
 Beschreibende Darstellung der älteren Bau- und Kunstdenkmäler des Königreichs Sachsen ("Descriptive representation of older architectural and art monuments of the Kingdom of Saxony"), Part 16 (1894) – Part 41 (1923)
 Die Baukunst Konstantinopels ("The architecture of Constantinople"), Berlin: E. Wasmuth (1912). Volume 1, Volume 2

External links 

 

 Quotes from Cornelius Gurlitt
 Technische Universität Dresden: Projekt "Nachlass Gurlitt"
 TU Dresden,Gurlitt
 Cornelius Gurlitt as Principal of the Technische Universität Dresden
 Biography in 'Deutsche Biographie'

German art historians
Writers from Dresden
Academic staff of TU Dresden
Architects from Dresden
1850 births
1938 deaths
German male non-fiction writers
Cornelius
German people of Jewish descent